Vahelna Jain temple is a Jain temple Vahelna village in Muzaffarnagar district of Uttar Pradesh, India.

About temple 
Shri 1008 Parshvnath Digamber Jain Atishye Kshetra popularly known as Vahelna Jain Mandir is a major historical & religious place for Jains. The temple hosts the main statue of Lord Parshvanatha in padmasan posture with Manastambha and a 31 feet gigantic statue in outer garden. The temple campus also has facility of Naturopathy for patients. The annual day of the temple is celebrated on 2 October every year when a fair and a procession is held inviting around thousands of people.

Reference

Citations

Sources

External links 
 

Jain temples in Uttar Pradesh
20th-century Jain temples